Bruce Shapiro is an American journalist, commentator and author. He is executive director of the Dart Center for Journalism and Trauma, a resource center and think tank for journalists who cover violence, conflict and tragedy, based at the Columbia University Graduate School of Journalism. In 2014 he received the International Society for Traumatic Stress Studies Public Advocacy Award recognizing "outstanding and fundamental contributions to the social understanding of trauma."  

Shapiro is a contributing editor at The Nation magazine and provides a weekly report on U.S. politics and culture to the Australian radio program Late Night Live. In addition to his leadership of the Dart Center he is adjunct professor at Columbia Journalism School, where he teaches ethics and serves as Senior Advisor for Academic Affairs, and a lecturer at Yale University, where he has taught investigative journalism since 1994. Shapiro serves on the board of directors and executive committee of the Global Investigative Journalism Network, on the international advisory board of the Judith Neilson Institute for Journalism and Ideas  in Australia and on the advisory board of the Rory Peck Trust based in London.

Books

References

External links

Author page at The Nation

American male journalists
Year of birth missing (living people)
Living people
Yale University faculty
Columbia University faculty
Columbia University Graduate School of Journalism faculty